Bermius is a genus of short-horned grasshoppers in the family Acrididae. There are at least four described species in Bermius, found in Australia.

Species
These species belong to the genus Bermius:
 Bermius brachycerus Stål, 1878
 Bermius buntamurra Rehn, 1957
 Bermius curvicercus Sjöstedt, 1921 (Sorghum Bermius)
 Bermius odontocercus Stål, 1878 (Eastern Toothed Bermius)

References

External links

 

Acrididae